The Octagon House (or the Dr. Horace Wakefield House) is a historic octagon house in Reading, Massachusetts.  Built in 1860 by Doctor Horace Wakefield, it is a distinctive variant of the type, executed as a series of small octagonal shapes around a central cupola.  The building is fashioned from large, heavy timbers in the manner of a log cabin, with long first-floor windows.  The porches and eaves have heavy zigzag trim and brackets, some of which have carvings resembling gargoyles.

The house was listed on the National Register of Historic Places in 1984.

See also
List of octagon houses
National Register of Historic Places listings in Reading, Massachusetts
National Register of Historic Places listings in Middlesex County, Massachusetts

References

Houses completed in 1860
Houses on the National Register of Historic Places in Reading, Massachusetts
Octagon houses in Massachusetts
Carpenter Gothic architecture in Massachusetts
Houses in Reading, Massachusetts
Carpenter Gothic houses in the United States